William Rolleston (19 September 1831 – 8 February 1903) was a New Zealand politician, public administrator, educationalist and Canterbury provincial superintendent.

Early life
Rolleston was born on 19 September 1831 at Maltby, Yorkshire as the 9th child of the Rev. George Rolleston and Anne Nettleship. His brother was the physician and zoologist George Rolleston.  He attended Rossall School and Emmanuel College, where he graduated in 1855 with second class honours in the classical tripos. He had intended to move to Canterbury but his father advised against it so he took up tutoring. However, this was merely a means of raising enough money to leave England in order to reject 'Conservatives and Ecclesiastics'.

Political career
Rolleston first joined the Canterbury Provincial Council when he was appointed to the Canterbury Executive Council on 4 December 1863. His tenure on the Executive Council finished on 16 June 1865. On 23 January 1864, he was elected as a provincial councillor in the Heathcote electorate and remained a councillor until 23 June 1865. On 22 May 1868, he was elected unopposed as the 4th (and last) Superintendent of the Canterbury Province. He held that office until the abolition of the provinces on 31 October 1876.

Rolleston represented the Avon electorate from a by-election in 1868 to 1884. In 1878 as an MP Rolleston proposed a school for deaf children. The government agreed to open a state school for the deaf in Christchurch, and the Sumner Deaf and Dumb Institution opened in 1880.

In the 1879 general election, he was returned unopposed. He then represented Geraldine from 1884 to 1887. He then represented Halswell from 1890 to 1893. The Halswell electorate was abolished in 1893, and he contested Ellesmere, where he was defeated. He then represented Riccarton from 1896 to 1899. He had won the 1896 election against George Warren Russell, but was defeated by him in 1899 by just one vote.

Rolleston served as Minister of Justice in the government of Premier John Hall from December 1880 to April 1881. He was also appointed Minister of Native Affairs in January 1881 after the resignation of John Bryce, heading the department as the Government prepared to invade the Māori settlement of Parihaka in November. Rolleston stood aside as minister on the night of 19 October 1881 after the Hall government's Executive Council held an emergency meeting in the absence of Governor Sir Arthur Gordon to issue a proclamation against Māori prophet Te Whiti and the inhabitants of Parihaka, ordering them to leave Parihaka and accept the sale and dismemberment of their land or face "the great evil which must fall on them". He was replaced as minister by his predecessor, John Bryce, who three weeks later led a raid by 1600 Armed Constabulary on the settlement, the centre of a passive resistance campaign against the sale of Māori land.

In 1891 he was elected unopposed as Leader of the Opposition.

Later life and commemoration
He married Elizabeth Mary Brittan in 1865 at Avonside, Christchurch; she was the daughter of Joseph Brittan. They had four daughters and five sons, including John, Frank and Arthur Rolleston. William Rolleston died at his Rangitata farm at Kapunatiki on 8 February 1903. He is buried at Holy Trinity Avonside. A statue was erected in his honour in front of the Canterbury Museum.

Notes

References

External links

  Gardner, W. J. Rolleston, William 1831 - 1903.  Dictionary of New Zealand Biography, updated 7 July 2005
 Biography in the 1966 Encyclopaedia of New Zealand
 

|-

|-

|-

|-

|-

|-

|-

|-

1831 births
1903 deaths
Alumni of Emmanuel College, Cambridge
Members of the New Zealand House of Representatives
Members of the Canterbury Provincial Council
Members of Canterbury provincial executive councils
Superintendents of New Zealand provincial councils
Members of the Cabinet of New Zealand
New Zealand education ministers
New Zealand farmers
People educated at Rossall School
Leaders of the Opposition (New Zealand)
New Zealand MPs for Christchurch electorates
Burials at Holy Trinity Avonside
Independent MPs of New Zealand
New Zealand MPs for South Island electorates
Unsuccessful candidates in the 1887 New Zealand general election
Unsuccessful candidates in the 1893 New Zealand general election
Unsuccessful candidates in the 1899 New Zealand general election
19th-century New Zealand politicians
William
Justice ministers of New Zealand
Brittan family